Our Lady of the Sacred Heart is a title of the Virgin Mary.

Our Lady of the Sacred Heart may also refer to:

Churches
 Abbey of Our Lady of the Sacred Heart, in Westmalle, Belgium
 Basilica of Our Lady of the Sacred Heart in Issoudun, France; Mexico City; and Sittard, Netherlands
 Church of Our Lady of the Sacred Heart, in Tappan, New York, United States
 Convent of Our Lady of the Sacred Heart, in Ottawa, Ontario, Canada 
 Nostra Signora del Sacro Cuore, in Rome's Piazza Navona
 Our Lady of the Sacred Heart church, in Carlton, Victoria, Australia
 Our Lady of the Sacred Heart Church, in Randwick, New South Wales, Australia
 Our Lady of the Sacred Heart Church, in Thursday Island, Australia
 Parish of Our Lady of the Sacred Heart, in Middlesbrough, England
 Our Lady of the Sacred Heart Parish Church, Tas-Sliema, Malta
 Our Lady of the Sacred Heart Parish Church, Punta Carretas, Montevideo, Uruguay
 Daughters of Our Lady of the Sacred Heart, a Roman Catholic order

Schools and colleges
Our Lady of the Sacred Heart College, Adelaide, in Enfield, South Australia
  Our Lady of the Sacred Heart College, Melbourne, in Bentleigh, Victoria, Australia 
Our Lady of the Sacred Heart College, Sydney, in Kensington, New South Wales, Australia
Our Lady of the Sacred Heart High School (Coraopolis), in Coraopolis, Pennsylvania, United States
Our Lady of the Sacred Heart Parish School, in Tappan, New York, United States
Our Lady of The Sacred Heart School in Hammond Island, Springsure, and Thursday Island in Queensland, Australia 
  Our Lady of the Sacred Heart School, in City Heights, San Diego, California, United States
  Our Lady of the Sacred Heart School, in Randwick, New South Wales, Australia
  Our Lady of the Sacred Heart School, in Quezon City, Metro Manila, Philippines